The 2016–17 Hapoel Ironi Kiryat Shmona season was the club's 17th season since its establishment in 2000, and 7th straight season in the Israeli Premier League since promoting from Liga Leumit in 2009–10.

During the 2016–17 campaign the club have competed in the Israeli Premier League, State Cup, Toto Cup.

Season review
After winning just one match of the first eight matches of the season, manager Motti Ivanir was sacked and was replaced by the coach of the U-21 team, Benny Ben Zaken. Ben Zaken himself was replaced following a disagreement with chairmen Izzy Sheratzky over the inclusion of Ahmed Abed in the line-up, with Sheratzky announcing the sacking of Ben Zaken on live radio during the team's match against Hapoel Ashkelon. Ben Zaken was replaced by Tomer Kashtan.

By the end of the regular season, the team failed to secure its place in the championship playoffs, falling from 6th to 7th in the last match of the regular season. In the relegation playoffs, the team managed to score only four points, though never dropping below 7th place, while allowing some youth players to get their first taste of league football.

Match results

Legend

League

State Cup

Toto Cup

Player details
List of squad players, including number of appearances by competition

|}

Transfers

In

Out

See also
 List of Hapoel Ironi Kiryat Shmona F.C. seasons

References

2016–17 in Israeli football
Hapoel Ironi Kiryat Shmona F.C. seasons
Hapoel Ironi Kiryat Shmona